Mahesh Bhupathi and Max Mirnyi defeated defending champions Wayne Arthurs and Paul Hanley 2–6, 6–3, 6–4 in the final. It was the 34th title for Bhupathi and the 20th title for Mirnyi in their respective careers.

Seeds
All seeds received a bye into the second round.

Draw

Finals

Top half

Bottom half

External links
 Main Draw

Men's Doubles
Italian Open - Doubles